Bathysmatophorinae is a small subfamily in the family Cicadellidae (leafhoppers).

Description
Bathysmatophorinae is a rare and primitive leafhopper subfamily, with a robust appearance and dull brown or grey colouration. They resemble members of the subfamily Evacanthinae, of which they used to be a part. Many females of this subfamily have short and stubby wings that cannot produce flight.

Distribution
These leafhoppers are found in temperate environments and have only been recorded in the Northern Hemisphere in the Palearctic and Neararctic. In the United States and Canada, they are most often found in the Pacific Northwest, although they can be found farther inland as well. They are found on Dicotyledon trees, shrubs, and ferns.

Tribes and genera
There are two tribes in the subfamily.

Genera considered members of the subfamily Bathysmatophorinae are listed below.

Bathysmatophorini
Erected by Anufriev in 1978.
 Ambericarda Szwedo & Gebicki, 1998
 Ankosus Oman & Musgrave, 1975
 Babacephala Ishihara, 1958
 Bathysmatophorus Sahlberg, J., 1871
 Carsonus Oman, 1938
 Errhomus Oman, 1938
 Erronus Hamilton & Zack, 1999
 Hylaius Oman & Musgrave, 1975
 Jantarivacanthus Szwedo, 2005
 Koreotettix Huh & Kwon, 1994
 Lystridea Baker, 1898
 Oniroxis China, 1925
 Thatuna Oman, 1938

Malmaemichungiini
Erected by Kwon in 1983. Recorded only from the Korean peninsula (Kwon, 1983).
 Bannalgaechungia Kwon, 1983
 Malmaemichungia Kwon, 1983

References

External links 
 database of observations in the U.S. and Canada

 
Cicadellidae
Hemiptera subfamilies